On February 9, 2016, two female suicide bombers affiliated with Boko Haram detonated their explosives killing more than 60 people and injured 78 others at a camp for displaced people in Dikwa, Nigeria. Officials said five suicide bombers had infiltrated the camp disguised as refugees with two of them, both women between the ages of 17 and 20, setting off their bombs as refugees were queuing for rations. A third bomber refused to kill herself after entering the camp and discovering her relatives were there, while two others also refused to set off their vests and escaped the camp.

Reactions
Nigerian Vice President Yemi Osinbajo addressed the nation after the attack in a statement: "The full weight of the Federal Government’s force will be deployed to hunt down the perpetrators of this evil act and confront terrorists who threaten lives, liberty and property of all Nigerians."

See also
 List of terrorist incidents, January–June 2016
 List of terrorist incidents linked to ISIL

References

2016 murders in Nigeria
Boko Haram bombings
Massacres perpetrated by Boko Haram
February 2016 crimes in Africa
Islamic State of Iraq and the Levant in Nigeria
Mass murder in 2016
Suicide bombings in Nigeria
Terrorist incidents in Nigeria in 2016
2010s massacres in Nigeria